Psáry is a municipality and village in Prague-West District in the Central Bohemian Region of the Czech Republic. It has about 4,100 inhabitants.

Administrative parts
The village of Dolní Jirčany is an administrative part of Psáry.

References

Villages in Prague-West District